GEV may refer to:
 G.E.V. (board game), a tabletop game by Steve Jackson Games
 Ashe County Airport, in North Carolina, United States
 Gällivare Lapland Airport, in Sweden
 Generalized extreme value distribution
 Gev Sella, Israeli-South African motorcyclist
 Gigaelectronvolt (GeV)
 Grid-enabled vehicle
 Ground effect vehicle
 Groundnut eyespot virus
 Viya language